Otoconcha dimidiata is a species of small air-breathing semi-slug, a terrestrial pulmonate gastropod mollusc in the family Charopidae. It has a very thin and cap like shell hidden under its skin in the rounded swelling behind the head.

Otoconcha dimidiata is the type species of the genus Otoconcha.

Distribution
This species occurs in both North and South islands of New Zealand.

Habitat 
This semi slug lives in rotting logs where it is rarely seen because of its secretive habits, but it is not rare.  It can be found by careful searching by torch light in damp areas of native forest.

Ecology   
Otoconcha dimidiata is the preferred prey of the carnivorous land gastropod Schizoglossa novoseelandica.

References

External links 
 Baker H. B. (1938) "The Endodont genus Otochoncha". 23: page 89-91.
 Suter H. (1913). Manual of the New Zealand Mollusca. Wellington, 1120 pp. page 620.
 Suter H. (1915). Manual of the New Zealand Mollusca. Atlas of plates. John Mackay, Government printer, Wellington. plate 25, figure 2, 2a.

Charopidae
Gastropods described in 1853